Richard Chichester du Pont (January 2, 1911 – September 11, 1943) was an American businessman and an aviation and glider pioneer who was a member of the prominent Du Pont family. He was the founder of the major US legacy carrier US Airways, after serving as a special assistant to General Henry H. Arnold, the chief of the United States Air Forces.

Biography
He was born on January 2, 1911, in Wilmington, Delaware. He was the son of A. Felix du Pont (1879–1948) and Mary Chichester (1878–1965).

As a young boy he developed an enthusiasm for aviation and took flying lessons. His interest in flight expanded to include gliders and he was flying them while still a teenager. At the University of Virginia, he founded a campus soaring club. In 1932, he went to study aviation at the Curtiss-Wright Technical Institute. That year, he and his sister Alice (1912–2002) flew an open-cockpit airplane up the Amazon River.

In 1933, Richard du Pont partnered with Hawley Bowlus to set up the Bowlus-du Pont Sailplane Company, a glider manufactory in San Fernando, California. Du Pont made a record flight in one of their sailplanes on September 21, 1933, taking off from Afton Mountain into the Rockfish Gap and gliding 121.6 miles to Frederick, Maryland. The firm remained in business for only a few years, ceasing operations in September 1936.

On March 19, 1934, Richard du Pont married Helena Allaire Crozer. They had two children, Richard Chichester du Pont, Jr. and Lana du Pont.

Richard du Pont and his older brother Alexis Felix du Pont, Jr. (1905–1996) established the forerunner to US Airways and now renamed American Airlines, the largest airline in the world. Their All American Aviation Company was at first an airmail service that eventually serviced parts of Pennsylvania, West Virginia, Kentucky, and Ohio. In 1949, the company began passenger service and changed its name to All American Airways and then to Allegheny Airlines.

During World War II, the United States War Department created the American Glider Program. After the death of the program's director, Lewin B. Barringer, Richard du Pont was made a Special Assistant to General "Hap" Arnold and placed in charge of the glider program at Army Air Force Headquarters. On September 11, 1943, at March Air Field in California, Richard du Pont was killed when the experimental XCG-16 glider in which he was a passenger crashed during a demonstration flight. After bailing out of the aircraft his parachute failed. His brother, Major Alexis Felix du Pont, Jr., was appointed to succeed him as head of the glider program.

Legacy
A three-time U.S. National Soaring Champion, since 1947 the Richard C. du Pont Memorial Trophy has been awarded annually to the U.S. National Open Class Soaring Champion. An American Legion post in Claymont, Delaware is named in his honor. Upon the creation of the Soaring Hall of Fame in 1954 by the Soaring Society of America, Richard du Pont was part of the first group of inductees.

In December 1943, he was posthumously awarded the Distinguished Service Medal.

The Richard Dupont Fellowship (DuPont Fellows program under the DuPont/MIT Alliance) has been awarded for studies in Aeronautics and Astronautics.

His widow, Allaire du Pont, operated Woodstock Farm in Chesapeake City, Maryland and owned Bohemia Stable, best known for the Hall of Fame thoroughbred racehorse, Kelso. She died January 6, 2006, at her Woodstock Farm near Chesapeake City, Maryland.

References

Further reading
Silent Wings by Gerard M. Devlin (1985) – St. Martin's Press, 
 The Evening Independent newspaper report on the death of Richard du Pont
 October 2, 1933 article on Richard Chichester du Pont

External links
The Richard C. du Pont Memorial Trophy website
 The George J. Frebert collection on Delaware Aviation  at Hagley Museum and Library contains documentation on the work of airline promoter Henry Belin du Pont and pilot Richard Chichester du Pont, including the latter's innovative but short-lived air-mail pick-up system for snagging mail sacks mounted on the ground.
 A finding aid for the Richard C. du Pont and Summit Aviation scrapbooks and photographs collection at Hagley Museum and Library, which contains materials focusing on his work with gliders and the establishment and growth of Summit Aviation, his son's private air transportation company.
A finding aid for Richard C. du Pont miscellany, a research collection at Hagley Museum and Library containing materials related to Richard C. du Pont and includes news clippings, official governmental documents related to his work, and the logbook of his yacht, Nahma.

1911 births
1943 deaths
20th-century American businesspeople
Richard Chichester du Pont
Aviators from Delaware
Aviators killed in aviation accidents or incidents in the United States
Gliding in the United States
Accidental deaths in California
Glider flight record holders
American aviation record holders
Victims of aviation accidents or incidents in 1943
United States Army Air Forces pilots of World War II
United States Army Air Forces personnel killed in World War II
Airline founders